The giant clingfish (Haplocylix littoreus) is a clingfish of the family Gobiesocidae, the only species in the genus Haplocylix. It is found all down the east coast of New Zealand around the low water mark amongst seaweed, on rocky coastlines. This species was originally described as Cyclopterus littoreus in 1801 by Johann Reinhold Forster,<ref name = CofF>{{Cof record|spid=13381|title='Cyclopterus littoreus|access-date=10 June 2019}}</ref> John C. Briggs subsequently placed it in the monotypic genus Haplocylix. Its closest relative appears to be the Caribbean deepwater clingfish Gymnoscyphus ascitus''.

References

Gobiesocidae
Endemic marine fish of New Zealand
Monotypic fish genera
Fish described in 1801